The Toll was a rock band from Columbus, Ohio.

The Toll may also refer to:

 The Toll (2020 film), a Canadian film
 The Toll (2021 film), a Welsh film
 "The Toll" (Justified), an episode of the television series Justified
 "The Toll" (Ozark), an episode of the television series Ozark

See also
 The Toll Gate (disambiguation)